Kalju Teras (1922–1990) was an Estonian educator. He attended Hugo Treffner Gymnasium from 1936 to 1941. During World War II he served in the Red Army. In 1956, he graduated from Tallinn University. During the period of 1967–1971 he was a member of the Supreme Soviet of the Estonian SSR. Heli Speek released a documentary film about Kalju Teras in 1987.

Awards 
  (1966)
 People's Teacher of the USSR (1982)

References 

1922 births
1990 deaths
Hugo Treffner Gymnasium alumni
Tallinn University alumni
Members of the Supreme Soviet of the Estonian Soviet Socialist Republic
People from Elva Parish
Soviet educators
Soviet military personnel of World War II